Galicia is divided into comarcas. In Galician, comarcas are also called bisbarras.

Comarcas of the province of A Coruña 
 A Barcala
 A Coruña
 Arzúa
 Barbanza
 Betanzos
 Bergantiños
 Eume
 Ferrol
 Fisterra
 Muros
 Noia
 O Sar
 Ordes
 Ortegal
 Santiago
 Terra de Melide
 Terra de Soneira
 Xallas

Comarcas of the province of Lugo 
 A Fonsagrada
 A Mariña Central
 A Mariña Occidental
 A Mariña Oriental
 A Ulloa
 Chantada
 Lugo
 Meira
 Os Ancares
 Quiroga
 Sarria
 Terra Chá
 Terra de Lemos

Comarcas of the province of Ourense 
 Allariz - Maceda
 A Baixa Limia
 O Carballiño
 A Limia
 Ourense
 O Ribeiro
 Terra de Caldelas
 Terra de Celanova
 Terra de Trives
 Valdeorras
 Verín
 Viana

Comarcas of the province of Pontevedra 
 A Paradanta
 Caldas
 O Deza
 O Baixo Miño
 O Condado
 O Morrazo
 O Salnés
 Pontevedra
 Tabeirós - Terra de Montes
 Vigo